The Forest Theater is an historic amphitheater in Carmel-by-the-Sea, California. Founded in 1910, it is one of the oldest outdoor theaters west of the Rockies. Actor/director Herbert Heron is generally cited as the founder and driving force, and poet/novelist Mary Austin is often credited with suggesting the idea. As first envisioned, original works by California authors, children's theatre, and the plays of Shakespeare were the primary focus. Since its inception, a variety of artists and theatre groups have presented plays, pageants, musical offerings and other performances on the outdoor stage, and the facility's smaller indoor theatre and school.

History

Forest Theater Society

Herbert Heron came to Carmel in 1908.  He had worked extensively on the stage in Los Angeles and came from a background of writers and dramatists.  On a visit from Los Angeles, Heron fell in love with the village by the sea.  He soon settled in Carmel, bringing with him his young bride Opal Heron, the daughter of a Polish Count.

In 1910, the Herons found a concave hillside looking out, surrounded by oaks and pines, and thought it would be an ideal space for an outdoor theater.  Heron's idea was to stage plays by Carmel authors starring local residents – a true community theater.  He approached James Franklin Devendorf, co-founder of the Carmel Development Company, and asked about purchasing the plot for such a purpose.  Devendorf, wanting to attract artistic spirits and "brain workers" to the nascent village, i.e. teachers, librarians, etc., agreed and let Heron have the space rent-free. He assisted in the clearing the land and building the stage.

By February 1910, construction began on the theater.  It was a simple plan:  a wooden proscenium stage with a scrim of pines and plain wooden benches.  Meanwhile, Heron was busying organizing the first production with the help of the newly minted Forest Theater Society.

The first theatrical production, David, a six-act biblical drama written by Constance Lindsay Skinner under the direction of Garnet Holme of Berkeley, inaugurated the Forest Theater on July 9, 1910. Reviewed in both Los Angeles and San Francisco it was reported that over 1,000 theatergoers attended the production. Heron produced and acted in the play as David. Helen Cooke played the character Michal, Joseph W. Hand as Hushai, as well as a cast of other local carmelites.

There was no electricity at the theater. In 1910, Calcium floodlights were brought by covered wagon from Monterey to light the stage. Two bonfires were also lit in semi-circular stone firepits on opposite ends of the proscenium, a tradition which continues today. In 1912, the first electric lights were used.

In July 1911, Shakespeare's Twelfth Night opened the second season at the Forest Theater. Garnet Holme was the producer. The Forest Theater Society produced several other plays in the next few years.  Of note was the 1911 production of the play The Land of Heart's Desire given by the Carmel Arts and Crafts Club, and the 1912 ancient Egyptian production of The Toad, a play written by Bertha Newberry, the wife of Perry Newberry, an early Carmel leader.  Also produced that year was the first children's play staged at the Forest Theater, Alice in Wonderland, adapted by Newberry and painter Arthur Honywood Vachell.

Western Drama Society & Carmel Arts & Crafts Club

There was so much enthusiasm for live theater, and varying ideas on how the Forest Theater should be run, that two additional theater groups began participating – The Western Drama Society (including Heron and other members of the Forest Theater Society), whose goal was to focus on California authors, and the already-established Carmel Arts and Crafts Club, which had been active in the town since 1905.

In 1913 theatergoers witnessed four new productions: the Robin Hood drama entitled Runnymede, Newberry's play for children Aladdin, Mary Hunter Austin's Fire starring George Sterling and directed by Austin herself, and Takeshi Kanno's poem-play Creation-Dawn.  A troublesome split in the ranks of the theater literati caused Sterling and Heron to found an alternative theater society, the California (or Western) Drama Society; the factions were eventually reconciled and returned to the Forest Theater. In 1915, a season that boasted 11 separate productions, audiences saw the premiere of Newberry's Junipero Serra, a historical pageant focusing on the life of Father Junípero Serra with Frederick R. Bechdolt as Serra; and Joseph W. Hand in his 7 Aug 1915 farewell appearance in the play The Man From Home, written by Harry Leon Wilson and Booth Tarkington In 1916 two of the celebrated productions were Yolanda of Cyprus and The Piper, in which four Carmel artists acted and painted scenery: Arthur Vachell, Mary DeNeale Morgan, William Frederic Ritschel, and Laura Maxwell.

Other Carmel artists who volunteered their time as actors and set designers include: Cornelius Botke, Ferdinand Burgdorff, Theodore Criley (remembered today for his "duel" outside the theater with Harry Leon Wilson), Josephine Culbertson, Homer Emens, William Kegg, Xavier Martinez, Paul Mays, Jo Mora, Ira Mallory Remsen, Herman Rosse, George Seideneck, William Silva, and Hamilton Wolf.  The ensuing decade saw the Forest Theater reach the height of production, with 50 plays and musicals staged between 1915 and 1924, including a 1922 production of Shaw's Caesar and Cleopatra, when director Edward G. Kuster was almost run out of town for erecting a giant backdrop that hid Carmel's beloved canopy of trees. Kuster defended himself admirably, noting that the play was, after all, set in a desert! Photographer Lewis Josselyn (1883-1964) was the official photographer for the Forest Theater Society. The California State Library has a large collection of his images from the plays produced at the theater. Remsen, a local painter and playwright, produced Inchling in 1922 and Mr. Bunt in 1924 at the Forest Theater. 

Unfortunately, this overabundance of plays became a serious strain on resources, such as players, donations and attendees, which were, understandably, spread thin.  Inevitably, factional strife erupted between the groups and the quality of theater in Carmel began to decline.  In 1924, in order to solve this dilemma and rebuild a healthy theater scene, the competing producing organizations disbanded, and under the auspices of the Carmel Arts and Crafts Club, the Forest Theater Corporation was created as a unifying entity to produce and manage the plays staged at the Forest Theater. In 1927, the Carmel Arts and Crafts Club and theater were sold to the Abalone League  and the proceeds were used to pay off the Forest Theater debts.

Once again, the picturesque outdoor theater became extremely popular in the small village and everyone, it seemed, added to the creative process.  The town's many carpenters and woodworkers built highly intricate sets; those handy with a thread and needle created costumes. And just about everyone found their way on stage.  Productions at the Forest Theater were truly a village affair.  The resulting success enabled the Carmel Club of Arts & Crafts to buy the land from the Carmel Development Company in 1925.  The Forest Theater Corporation continued to produce plays throughout the 1920s and early 1930s.  While the state of theater in Carmel was in a precarious position due to a glut of indoor theaters and theatrical companies, the Forest Theater continued to flourish.  In 1934, the Forest Theater saw its 100th major production, The Man Who Married a Dumb Wife, by Anatole France.  Heron directed the comedy, which featured set and costumes designs by Helena Heron.

On July 22, 1922, the Carmel Woods subdivision was opened to the public with 119 homesites offered for sale. The opening day, coincided with Serra Day, officially proclaimed as a holiday by the town trustees of Carmel; and the Serra festival featuring Garnet Holme's Carmel Mission play Serra, at the Forest Theater.

Great Depression

The Great Depression struck and it affected all aspects of local life. The Forest Theater had accumulated debt that had taken its toll. In September 1936, Inchling was presented again under the direction of Byington Ford. The revival of Inchling, and accompanied village fair at the theater grounds, brought in a profit of $1,000, which reduced the theater's debt. When repairs were needed and no money could be found from local donors, the idea of applying for WPA money was proffered.  Funds were only available to government entities and the private non-profit Arts & Crafts Club was not eligible.  In 1937, it was decided to deed the Forest Theater to the City of Carmel-by-the-Sea in order to obtain WPA funds for major renovations, with the stipulation that the facility would be a public park and "continue outdoor theater performances."  Improvements to the facility included building new benches, laying a concrete foundation for the stage, and replacing the surrounding barbed-wired fences with a traditional grape-stake fence. The Forest Theatre was unused during the three years of renovations.

In 1937, the property was deeded to the City of Carmel-by-the-Sea in order to qualify for federal funding and, in 1939, the site became a Works Progress Administration (WPA) project. The WPA rebuilt the outdoor theatre and created an indoor facility beneath the outdoor stage, the site re-opened as The Carmel Shakespeare Festival, with Herbert Heron as its Director, and, with the exception of the World War II years of 1943–44, the festival continued through the late 1940s. In 1949, Heron and twenty villagers started the first Forest Theater Guild. In 1958, the City Council instituted an Arts Commission, charged with operation and maintenance of the Forest Theater. The guild remained active until it disbanded in 1961, after which the outdoor theatre lay unused and neglected for over a decade.

Carmel Shakespeare Festival

With a rejuvenated space, the Forest Theater was ready to get back into the theater business.  The works of Shakespeare had proven highly popular beginning with Heron's 1911 production of Twelfth Night, and upon completion of the WPA project, Heron formally resumed productions with the inauguration of the Carmel Shakespeare Festival in 1940.  The festival offered Shakespeare, including Macbeth, Hamlet, Julius Caesar and As You Like It, as well as the works of Carmel authors, including the first local production of Robinson Jeffers' The Tower Beyond Tragedy.  With the advent of World War II, however, mandatory blackouts were ordered for coastal towns and cities.  The residents of Carmel participated and halted all Forest Theater activity, essentially closing the facility in 1943–44, and again in 1946.  From 1947 to 1949, the facility resumed annual productions of Shakespeare and local authors. The Carmel Shakespeare Festival was reactivated in 1990 Pacific Repertory Theatre (see below).

Forest Theater Guild
Throughout this time, Herbert Heron maintained his intense involvement with the Forest Theater, continuing to write, produce, direct and star in productions.  Growing tired of the constant activity, Heron retired from active involvement.  Theater was in Heron's blood, though, and he could not completely leave the theater behind.  As part of deeding the Forest Theater to the City of Carmel-by-the-Sea, the City took over responsibility for the physical plant.  Realizing that a supporting organization was needed for the City-owned facility, Heron organized and co-founded the Forest Theater Guild in 1949.  Guided by Cole Weston and Philip Oberg, the Forest Theater Guild began to produce plays by local authors, Shakespeare, and classic drama. In 1961, the original Forest Theater Guild ceased operations.

End of Heron era

In 1960, Herbert Heron finished his 50th year with the Forest Theater with his own play, Pharaoh.  By 1963 the theater had shown over 140 plays, including 64 premieres and dramatizations by California authors. Numbered among these productions were those by Shakespeare, George Bernard Shaw, Greek tragedies, local history, children's plays, light operas and musical comedies. Following a brief illness Herbert Heron died on January 8, 1968, at the age of 84.

Despite some continued play production, parts of the theater were left in disrepair.  Upkeep was not maintained by the city and, during the mid-1960s, the wood in the stage and seating rotted and the grounds became rundown.  By this time, the Forest Theater Guild had closed and abandoned the facility, and, with a few minor exceptions, no plays were being shown on the main stage.  The city began to use the site for other purposes, such as a Boy Scout camp, and a corporate yard.  The Cultural Commission recommended to the City that either repairs should be made to the aging Forest Theater, or it should be unloaded from the city's holdings.  At that time, no action was taken.  In 1966 the usefulness of the Forest Theater was discussed at City Council during the 1966-1967 budget meetings.  Discussions included whether it was cost-effective to keep the theater, resulting in an uproar by Carmelites determined to save the historic site.  In 1968, to keep the Forest Theater in use, Cole Weston, who had then become the city's first Cultural Director, leased the Theater-in-the-Ground to the then-homeless Children's Experimental Theatre.

Children's Experimental Theater
From 1968 to 2010, Marcia Hovick's Children's Experimental Theatre (CET), leased the indoor theater, which is now operated by Pacific Repertory Theatre's School of Dramatic Arts (SoDA). Formed in 1960 by Marcia Hovick to develop "creative confidence" through theatre training, CET had been using space at the Golden Bough Playhouse and Sunset Center, and needed a permanent place for their activities. 

In 1969, Hovick formed a new production entity called the Staff Players Repertory Company, staging classic drama on the small Indoor Forest Theater stage. In 1971, a second Forest Theater Guild was established by Cole Weston, and the group began producing summer musicals and community plays on the outdoor stage. In 2010, after 50 years of continuous business, CET ceased operations. The lease on the school was then given to Pacific Repertory Theatre for its ten-year-old School of Dramatic Arts (SoDA).

Threat of Closure and revival of Forest Theater Guild

In spite of this new use of the Forest Theater, the main stage remained dark and, once again, reservations about the usefulness of the theater were voiced.  In 1971, the Cultural Commission considered closing the theater for good. Again, the residents of Carmel rose up and voiced their opposition. A second Forest Theater Guild was created, this time as a nonprofit organization, with former president Cole Weston as the new Guild President. In order to raise needed funds, as well as draw attention to the possible closure, the new group produced a staged reading of Robinson Jeffers' Medea and The Tower Beyond Tragedy, which featured a noted performance by actress Dame Judith Anderson.

In 1972, the Guild officially incorporated, and staged their first full production, producing Shakespeare's Twelfth Night.  The success of this production showed the City that there was still public interest and support for the Forest Theater.  The City Council commissioned a study to evaluate the efficacy of the theater.  The public was invited to comment and, after several months of often heated discussions, several recommendations were made:  The City Council decided to continue city operation of the facility, and the outdoor theater would be leased to the Forest Theater Guild on a two-year trial basis. The trial was a success, and the lease with the Forest Theater Guild was renewed.  Over the next several decades, the Guild produced over 20 major plays, including Moon for the Misbegotten and A Long Day's Journey into Night. In 1997, the guild began Films in the Forest, a series of first-run movies, classic feature films, and documentary film screenings. These cinema favorites included classics such as Band Wagon and family favorites such as Finding Nemo.

In 2019, the Forest Theater Guild was informed by Sunset Center (the organization which currently manages the venue) that they would no longer be able to stage live performances there, limiting their options to showing films. However, this course was later reversed.

Closings and reopenings
On April 23, 2014, the facility was shuttered due to health and safety issues caused by years of deferred maintenance. In a special workshop on May 5, 2014, after declaring a "cultural community emergency", the city council declared a "cultural community emergency" developing a quick consensus that the historic facility should be reopened as soon as possible.

In January 2015, however, anticipating delays in the renovation schedule, the city announced that the reopening of the theatre would be postponed until 2016, and that an agreement was reached with the theater companies that cancelled the 2015 season in the interest of getting the work "done right". After a contentious design period, which raised "concerns about the architect's ADA compliance plan", the two-phase project was approved in a rare split-vote of the city council, and a divided theatre community. Phase 1 of the renovation addressed the "red tag issues" and ADA compliance requirements, while phase 2 will upgrade the concessions and restroom facilities, and make other improvements. As of December, 2019, Phase 2 has yet to be planned or budgeted for.

In June 2016, the Forest Theater was reopened and began performances again starting with a production of The Borrowers, the musical in June by Carmel playwright Walter DeFaria. It was followed by Pacific Repertory Theatre productions of The Wizard of Oz and Shakespeare's Twelfth Night. 

In 2017, the nearby Sunset Center signed a 30-year lease with the city of Carmel to manage the site. In 2019, Carmel's oldest community theatre, The Forest Theater Guild, announced that Sunset Center management had drastically cut back the Guild's 12-week season, offering only 12 dates at the historic theatre for film presentations, and no dates, whatsoever, for their theatrical productions. Among other reasons, including seeking greater diversity, the Sunset Center management cited the need to "improve the revenue situation at the Forest Theater." The Forest Theater Guild asked the city council to intervene.

In 2020, the venue was once again closed, this time due to the COVID-19 pandemic. In 2021, the Sunset Center sought an early end to their 30-year lease agreement. The city of Carmel then decided to accept proposals for a new organization to manage the venue and solicited the public for input on how to use the space. In August 2021, the theater reopened with a seven-week run of Shrek, put on by Pacific Repertory Theatre.

In early 2022, the city of Carmel entered into a lease with Pacific Repertory Theatre for the nonprofit to manage the venue for the next five years, with a five-year renewal option. The Forest Theater Guild was designated an “historic user” and will once again be allowed to stage theatrical productions.

The venue is currently open and presents events produced by the Forest Theater Guild, Pacific Repertory Theatre, the Monterey Symphony, as well as other small arts organizations and civic events.

Pacific Repertory Theatre

In 1984, Pacific Repertory Theatre (PacRep) began producing classics, children's theater and musicals on the outdoor stage, reactivating Herbert Heron's Carmel Shakespeare Festival in 1990. In 1997, The Forest Theater Guild added the Films in the Forest movie series, featuring cinema favorites from classics such as It's a Wonderful Life to feature films like Frozen. In 2005, PacRep presented the theater's highest-attended production, Disney's Beauty and the Beast, to a combined audience of over 10,000 ticket holders.

In 1984, a new organization joined the Forest Theater community, GroveMont Theatre.  GroveMont was founded in 1982 by Stephen Moorer, who had participated in the Children's Experimental Theatre program, and had also acted in Forest Theater Guild productions.  In 1984, at the request of the Carmel Cultural Commission, GroveMont began producing shows at the Forest Theater, staging Jeffers' Medea, starring local actress Rosamond Goodrich Zanides.

In 1990, Moorer reactivated the old Carmel Shake-speare Festival of the 1940s, adding the hyphen in "Shake-speare" to denote interest and support research into the Shakespeare Authorship Question. In 1993, the company changed its name to Pacific Repertory Theatre (PacRep), becoming the only professional theater company in residence at the Forest Theater, continuing to stage productions at the Forest Theater every September and October, expanding into August in 2000. In 2011, following the closure of the 50-year-old CET, the City of Carmel awarded the year-round lease of the indoor Forest Theater to PacRep for its educational SoDA program.

Pacific Repertory Theatre's annual family musicals have included "high-flying" technology by ZFX, Inc. for productions of Peter Pan, The Wizard of Oz, and Disney's The Little Mermaid. Among the many successful productions at the Forest Theater over the years, 2006's Disney's Beauty and the Beast proved to be a benchmark for attendance records.  Directed by Walt DeFaria and produced by Moorer, the musical sold over 10,000 tickets.

Plays 
The following plays were successfully presented by Carmel residents at the Forest Theater:

 David (1910) - Constance Skinner
 Twelfth Night (1911) - Garmet Holme
 The Land of Heart's Desire (1911) - W. B. Yeats
 Alice in Wonderland (1912) - Perry Newberry
 The Toad (1912) - Bertha Newberry
 Romeo and Juliet (1912), (1927), (1948) - Herbert Heron
 Runnymede (1913) - William Greer Harrison
 Fire (1913) - Mary Austin
 Aladdin And the Lamp (1913) - Elizabeth Field Christy and Perry Newberry
 The Tailsman (1913) - Raine Bennett
 A Wife of Nippon (1913) - Redfern Mason
 The Arrow-Maker (1914) - Mary Austin
 Montezuma (1914) - Herbert Heron
 Junipero Serra (1915) - Perry Newberry
 The Man from Home (1915) - Booth Tarkington and Harry Leon Wilson
 Junipero Serra (1915) - Garnet Holme
 The People's Attorney (1915) - Perry Newberry
 The Spy (1915) - Herbert Heron
 The Columbine (1915) - Helen Parks
 A Midsummer Night's Dream (1915) - Herbert Heron and Helen Parks
 Stop ! Look ! Listen ! (1915) - Irving Berlin and Harry B. Smith, staged by R. H. Burnside
 The Ebb Tide: Tusitala (1916) - John Northern Hilliard and Herbert Heron
 The Black Arrow: Tusitala (1916) - Herbert Heron
 Treasure Island: Tusitala (1916) - Herbert Heron
 Wier of Hermiston: Tusitala (1916) - 191
 Tusitala The Prologue (1916)
 The Piper (1916) - Glenn Hughes
 A Thousand Years Ago (1917) - Percy Mac Kaye
 Arms and the Man (1919) - Herbert Heron
 Tents of the Arabs (1920) - Herbert Heron
 Confounding of the Witch (1921) - Grace Wickham and James Hopper
 Inchling (1922) - Ira Remsen
 Caesar and Cleopatra (1922)
 Mr. Bunt (1924) - Ira Remsen
 Quality Street (1924)
 The Man Who Married a Dumb Wife (1924), (1934)

The following plays were successfully presented by non Carmel residents:

 Creation-Dawn (1915) - Takeshi Kanno
 Sons of Spain (1915) - Sydney Coe Howard
 Yolanda of Cyprus (1916) - Cale Young Rice

See also 
 List of contemporary amphitheaters

References

External links 

Forest Theater Guild
Pacific Repertory Theatre
Sunset Center

Outdoor theatres
Theatres in California
Tourist attractions in Monterey County, California
Buildings and structures in Monterey County, California
Works Progress Administration in California
Theatres completed in 1910
1910 establishments in California
Carmel-by-the-Sea, California